Allendale, Columbus, Georgia is a neighborhood located in Columbus, Georgia. The boundaries of the area are Wilbur Drive to the north, Miller Road and the Columbus Airport to the south, Bill Heard Parkway to the west and Moon Road to the east.

Columbus metropolitan area, Georgia
Neighborhoods in Columbus, Georgia